Blue Ridge Railway may refer to:
Blue Ridge Railroad (1849–1870) in Virginia, predecessor of the Chesapeake and Ohio Railway
Blue Ridge Railway (1901) in South Carolina, predecessor of the Southern Railway until about 1990
Blue Ridge Railroad of South Carolina, 1852–1880, predecessor of the above
Blue Ridge Scenic Railway, tourist line in Georgia
Virginia Blue Ridge Railway, 1914–1980, short line in Virginia
Blue Ridge Railway Trail, built along the above